Czernikowo is a village in Toruń County, Kuyavian-Pomeranian Voivodeship, in north-central Poland.

It is the seat of the gmina (administrative district) called Gmina Czernikowo. It is located in the historic Dobrzyń Land.

The village has a population of 2,752..

History
During the German occupation of Poland (World War II), Czernikowo was one of the sites of executions of Poles, carried out by the Germans in 1939 as part of the Intelligenzaktion.

Education
There is a primary school and a general education liceum (high school) in Czernikowo.

References

Villages in Toruń County